Opequon Presbyterian Church is a historic Presbyterian church located near Winchester, in Frederick County, Virginia. It was built in 1897, and is a one-story, gable-roofed, random-rubble stone church. It features Gothic-arched colored-glass, one-over-one windows and a three-stage corner bell tower containing an entrance.  Also on the property are four burying grounds (one contributing) with the oldest marked grave site dated to 1742.

It was listed on the National Register of Historic Places in 2001.

Gallery

See also
 National Register of Historic Places listings in Frederick County, Virginia

References

External links

 

Churches on the National Register of Historic Places in Virginia
Presbyterian churches in Virginia
National Register of Historic Places in Frederick County, Virginia
Gothic Revival church buildings in Virginia
Victorian architecture in Virginia
Churches completed in 1897
Churches in Frederick County, Virginia